Hal Raymond Gross (died October 13, 2002) was a bishop in the Episcopal Church, serving as suffragan in the Diocese of Oregon from 1965 to 1979.  Prior to that he had served as archdeacon.

References 

2002 deaths
Episcopal bishops of Oregon